Astrocladus is a genus of echinoderms belonging to the family Gorgonocephalidae.

The species of this genus are found in Southern Africa, Southeastern Asia and Australia.

Species:

Astrocladus africanus 
Astrocladus annulatus 
Astrocladus coniferus 
Astrocladus dofleini 
Astrocladus euryale 
Astrocladus exiguus 
Astrocladus goodingi 
Astrocladus hirtus 
Astrocladus ludwigi 
Astrocladus pardalis 
Astrocladus socotrana 
Astrocladus tonganus

References

Gorgonocephalidae
Ophiuroidea genera